Czarna Woda is a town in northern Poland.

Czarna Woda ("black water") may also refer to:
Czarna Woda, Opole Voivodeship, a village south-west Poland
Czarna Woda, part of the village of Jaworki, Lesser Poland Voivodeship, southern Poland
Czarna Woda (Kaczawa), a river in Poland